The JSC Admiralty Shipyards (formerly Soviet Shipyard No. 194) is one of the oldest and largest shipyards in Russia, located in Saint Petersburg. Military products include naval warships such as nuclear and diesel-powered submarines and large auxiliaries.

History 

The shipyard was founded as the Galley Yard by Peter the Great during the Great Northern War on 5 November 1704 and located in the open ground along the Neva River behind the Admiralty building. It was administered by the Russian Admiralty, hence its later name. In 1721 it was renamed Galley Wharf and in 1800 the New Admiralty Yard, supplementing and in 1841 soon replacing the Galley Wharf. In 1908, it was renamed the Admiralty Shipyard. In 1937 its two sections were known as Andre Marti and Sudomekh, Shipyards No. 194 and No. 196, respectively.  In 1966 it once again became the New Admiralty Shipyard as in 1800 and, in 1972, the Leningrad Admiralty Association.  The latest name changes occurred in 1992 – State Enterprise "Admiralty Wharves" – and in 2001 – Federal State Unitary Enterprise "Admiralty Wharves".  Finally, in 2008, it became an open stock company – OAO "Admiralty Wharves".

From its founding through 1917 the shipyard built more than 1000 vessels and ships, including 137 large sail warships, about 700 medium and small sail and oared vessels, and more than 100 iron ships, including 25 armored warships and 8 cruisers.  In 1959 it delivered the world's first non-naval nuclear-powered vessel, the icebreaker .

In the 19th century it was a major builder of battleships and submarines and cruisers in the 20th. Since the mid-1950s its surface-ship facilities have specialized in large merchant ships, icebreakers, large rescue and salvage ships, fish-factory ships, floating dry docks, and a few naval auxiliaries.

Examples of non-military production from the Admiralty Wharves abound in St. Petersburg, from the bronze tablets, candelabra, and angel of the Alexander Column in Palace Square, the statuary and roof of St. Isaac's Cathedral, a number of bridges over the canals, and most of the ornate cast iron fencing in old St. Petersburg. All were products of the shipyard's foundry.

Submarines 
In 1966, the shipyard delivered the Victor I-class nuclear attack submarine, and later the Victor II and Victor III-class submarines as well as the titanium hulled .

From 1973 to 1998, the shipyard has built 298 submarines, including 41 nuclear submarines, as well as 68 submersibles. The specialized submersibles produced include the civilian Sever-2 (1969), Tinro-2 (1972), Bentos (1975–1982), Tetis (1976), Osa, Argus, and Osmotr (1988) types, plus the naval Lima, Uniform, Xray, Beluga, and Paltus classes.

Admiralty Shipyards still specializes in submarine shipbuilding. The most recently built submarines include s and the smaller Petersburg/. In 1992 Iran purchased two Kilo-class submarines for $600 million from the United Admiralty Sudomekh shipyard, with an option to buy a third.

The construction of underwater vessels constitutes 70% of the total production volume of the shipyard. Out of all submarines built in the world, 15% by tonnage are produced at the Admiralty Shipyards. 

Admiralty Shipyards in St. Petersburg will build six Kilo-class diesel-electric submarines for delivery to Vietnam, the Russian business daily Kommersant said in April 2009. The paper quoted company general director Vladimir Aleksandrov as saying that Russia's state arms exporter Rosoboronexport would soon sign a contract with a foreign state, and that Admiralty Shipyards had been chosen to fulfill this contract. Sources in Rosoboronexport later confirmed that Russia and Vietnam had been negotiating a $1.8 billion deal on the delivery of six Kilo-class submarines to the Vietnamese navy for about a year. Admiralty Shipyards is currently building two Kilo-class submarines for Algeria to be delivered in 2009 and 2010.

Oil tankers 
The tanker has double hull and is able to run in solid-ice up to a half-meter thick at a speed of 1½–2 knots. During recent years the shipyard constructed five ships for Russia's largest oil company (Lukoil)—Astrakhan, Magas, Kaliningrad, Saratov, Usinsk. All of which are working on the Northern Sea Route.

Present day 

Military shipbuilding consists of orders from the Russian Ministry of Defense and export orders for foreign governments. The shipyard's military orders are primarily submarines, but also include non-military repair, modernization and building of other underwater technical innovations for oceanic development.

The shipyard announced on December 24, 2022 that general director Alexander Buzakov had died suddenly that day. it did not give a reason.  He had been in the job since August 2011. United Shipbuilding Corporation released a statement: “The United Shipbuilding Corporation, the Admiralty Shipyards and the entire national shipbuilding industry have suffered an irreparable loss, as Alexander Sergeevich Buzakov, Director General of the Admiralty Shipyards, passed away at the age of 66,”

Extension on Kotlin Island 
It is unknown what will happen with the project to have new shipyards built on Kotlin Island. These shipyards were to be created specifically for building of two  amphibious-assault ships. The construction of these ships is all but cancelled.

Facilities and services

See also 
 Charles Baird (engineer)
 Baltic Shipyard
 Severnaya Verf
 Sovkomflot
 List of ships of Russia by project number

Notes

Bibliography

External links 
 Made in Russia:Admiralty Shipyard (English)

Shipbuilding companies of Imperial Russia
Shipbuilding companies of the Soviet Union
Manufacturing companies based in Saint Petersburg
1704 establishments in Russia
Ships built at Admiralty Shipyard
Companies nationalised by the Soviet Union
United Shipbuilding Corporation